The year 1935 in television involved some significant events.
Below is a list of television-related events during 1935.


Events

March 22 – Germany begins regular television service in Berlin (Deutscher Fernseh-Rundfunk), from the Fernsehsender Paul Nipkow, using a 180-line electronic television system.  It is generally only seen in public viewing rooms seating 30 people each.
April 26 – France begins broadcasting regular transmissions from the top of the Eiffel Tower.
September 11 – Final transmission of John Logie Baird’s 30-line television system by the BBC. The BBC begins preparations for a regular high definition broadcasting service from Alexandra Palace.

Births
January 8 - Elvis Presley, singer and actor (died 1977)
January 9 
Bob Denver, actor, Gilligan's Island (died 2005)
Dick Enberg, sports commentator (died 2017)
January 16 - Russ McCubbin, actor, Cheyenne
February 16 – Sonny Bono, singer, actor, politician, comedian, The Sonny & Cher Comedy Hour (died 1998)
February 17 
Chabelo, Mexican actor and host
Christina Pickles, actress, Guiding Light, St. Elsewhere
February 25 – Sally Jessy Raphael, talk show hostess
March 1 – Robert Conrad, actor, The Wild Wild West, Baa Baa Black Sheep (died 2020)
March 9 - Joseph Gallison, actor, Days of Our Lives
March 15 
Jimmy Swaggart, televangelist
Judd Hirsch, actor, Taxi, Dear John, Numb3rs
March 18 – John Hamblin, English-born Australian children's television presenter (died 2022)
March 20 – Ted Bessell, actor and director, That Girl (died 1996)
March 24 – Mary Berry, English food writer
April 4 – Kenneth Mars, actor, (died 2011)
April 13 – Lyle Waggoner, actor, The Carol Burnett Show, Wonder Woman (died 2020)
April 19 – Dudley Moore, actor (died 2002)
May 8 – Salome Jens, actress
May 25 – Victoria Shaw, actress (died 1988)
May 27 – Lee Meriwether, actress, Barnaby Jones
June 21 – Monte Markham, actor, The New Perry Mason
June 28 – John Inman, English actor, Are You Being Served (died 2007) 
July 9 – Michael Williams, English actor (died 2001) 
July 15 
Alex Karras, football player, actor, Webster (died 2012)
Ken Kercheval, actor, Dallas  (died 2019)
July 17
Donald Sutherland, Canadian actor
Diahann Carroll, actress, singer, Julia (died 2019)
August 8 - Donald P. Bellisario, American television producer
August 28 - Sonny Shroyer, actor, The Dukes of Hazard
September 21 – Henry Gibson, actor, poet, Rowan and Martin's Laugh-In, The Wuzzles, Aaahh!!! Real Monsters, Rocket Power, The Grim Adventures of Billy & Mandy, King of the Hill (died 2009)
September 24 – Sean McCann, Canadian actor (died 2019)
October 1 – Julie Andrews, actress, singer
October 18 – Peter Boyle, actor, Everybody Loves Raymond (died 2006)
October 19 – Jerry Bishop, American announcer (died 2020)
October 20 – Jerry Orbach, actor, Law & Order (died 2004)
November 27 – Verity Lambert, producer (died 2007)
December 1 – Woody Allen, comedy writer, comedian, actor, screenwriter, film director
December 12 - Al Harrington, actor, Hawaii Five-O
December 21 – Phil Donahue, talk show host

References